Doug Lytle (born 7 August 1962) is a retired American pole vaulter.

He was born in Kansas City, Missouri. He finished sixth at the 1984 Olympic Games and eighth at the 1987 World Indoor Championships. His personal best jump was 5.72 metres, achieved in April 1986 in Lawrence, Kansas.

References

1962 births
Living people
Track and field athletes from Kansas City, Missouri
American male pole vaulters
Olympic track and field athletes of the United States
Athletes (track and field) at the 1984 Summer Olympics